Unbalanced Load is the second album by comedian Doug Benson, and his first released by Comedy Central Records

Track listing
"My Name Is..." – 2:30
"Super High Me" – 4:20
"Three Legged Cat" – 2:52
"Segues" – 3:08
"The Hoover Dam Bit" – 3:05
"New Orgasm Noise" – 1:15
"I Love Movies" – 6:40
"Boo and Hiss" – 3:29
"Drinking" – 2:04
"Public Restrooms" – 4:50
"Mystery" – 4:00
"Questions or Comments" – 3:12
"How to Deal With a Heckler" – 2:59
"Twitter" – 2:15
"Best Story Ever" – 8:34

Reception

David Jeffries of Allmusic wrote, "Much of the material has been in Benson's set for ages, but returning fans will appreciate having these bits documented on a widely available release. No harshed mellows here, just a fine accompaniment for nights filled with snack chips and couch lock. Punchline Magazine placed it in its "The 10 Best Comedy Albums of 2009" at No. 5.

Chart positions

References

2009 live albums
Comedy Central Records live albums
Stand-up comedy albums
Spoken word albums by American artists
Live spoken word albums
Doug Benson albums